George Edward Ainsley (15 April 1915 – April 1985) was an English professional footballer and football manager.

Playing career 
George Ainsley,a centre forward, played for his local side South Shields St. Andrews before joining Sunderland in April 1932. He made his league debut on 6 May 1933 in a 1–1 draw away to Chelsea. He played three more times the following season, in  games against Portsmouth, Stoke City and Manchester City, but failed to feature again for Sunderland.

He left to join Bolton Wanderers in August 1936. In December the same year, after just seven league games for Bolton, Ainsley moved to Leeds United. He scored on his league debut (On 19 December against Sunderland) and scored twice in his second appearance (as Leeds beat Middlesbrough).

He was never a regular at Elland Road, despite scoring 30 times in 89 league games. He remained with Leeds until after the war, joining Bradford Park Avenue in November 1947. He retired from playing in 1949, having scored 29 goals in 44 games for Bradford Park Avenue.

Coaching career 
After retiring as a player, Ainsley travelled the world as a coach. He began coaching in India in 1950, where he was the coach of Bengal and Bombay football teams for four months. He returned to coach the football team at Cambridge University in the early 1950s. In Bergen,
he trained the Norwegian team SK Brann half of 1955. He was head coach of Ghana between 1958 and 1959. He was later coach of the Pakistan national team until November 1962 when he moved to Highland Park, Johannesburg as coach. Late in 1963 he became the manager of the Israel national side, leaving that post in December 1964.

He was appointed manager of Workington in June 1965, guiding the side to their highest ever league position (5th in Division Three) the following season. However, Workington were relegated at the end of the 1966–67 season and Ainsley was sacked in November 1966. He then coached USL Dunkerque in France.

Death 
He died in Leeds in 1985.

References

External links
Profile at Leeds-Fans.org

1915 births
1985 deaths
Footballers from South Shields
Bolton Wanderers F.C. players
Bradford (Park Avenue) A.F.C. players
English football managers
English footballers
Expatriate football managers in France
Expatriate football managers in Ghana
Expatriate football managers in Israel
English expatriate sportspeople in France
English expatriate sportspeople in Norway
English expatriate sportspeople in Israel
Expatriate football managers in Norway
English expatriate football managers
SK Brann managers
Israel national football team managers
Leeds United F.C. players
Huddersfield Town A.F.C. wartime guest players
Liverpool F.C. wartime guest players
Sunderland A.F.C. players
English Football League players
Workington A.F.C. managers
USL Dunkerque managers
Ghana national football team managers
Pakistan national football team managers
English expatriate sportspeople in Pakistan
Expatriate football managers in Pakistan
Association football forwards
Expatriate football managers in India
English expatriate sportspeople in India